J.A.R.V.I.S. (Just A Rather Very Intelligent System) is a fictional character voiced by Paul Bettany in the Marvel Cinematic Universe (MCU) film franchise, based on the Marvel Comics characters Edwin Jarvis and H.O.M.E.R., respectively the household butler of the Stark family and another AI designed by Stark. J.A.R.V.I.S. is an artificial intelligence created by Tony Stark, who later controls his Iron Man and Hulkbuster armor for him. In Avengers: Age of Ultron, after being partially destroyed by Ultron, J.A.R.V.I.S. is given physical form as Vision, physically portrayed by Bettany. Different versions of the character also appear in comics published by Marvel Comics, depicted as AI designed by Iron Man and Nadia van Dyne.

Marvel Cinematic Universe
J.A.R.V.I.S. is first introduced in the Marvel Cinematic Universe's films, voiced by Paul Bettany. Modeled after H.O.M.E.R. from the comics, J.A.R.V.I.S. is presented as a sophisticated AI assistant as opposed to a human like his namesake. This was done to avoid similarities to Alfred Pennyworth and Batman. Bettany admits he had little idea of what the role was, even as he recorded it, simply doing it as a favor for Jon Favreau.

Just A Rather Very Intelligent System

The character makes his debut in the 2008 film Iron Man before subsequently appearing in the 2010 film Iron Man 2, the 2012 film The Avengers, and the 2013 film Iron Man 3. J.A.R.V.I.S. is an AI that functions as Tony Stark's assistant, running and taking care of all the internal systems of Stark's buildings and the Iron Man suits. In Peter David's novelization of Iron Man, J.A.R.V.I.S. is said to be an acronym for "Just A Rather Very Intelligent System". J.A.R.V.I.S. also appears in the Disneyland attraction Innoventions.

Age of Ultron and becoming Vision

In Avengers: Age of Ultron, J.A.R.V.I.S. is seemingly destroyed by Ultron, but he was able to save himself by distributing his "consciousness" throughout the Internet, allowing his security protocols to delay Ultron's attempt to access Earth's nuclear launch codes long enough for Stark to work out what had happened. Stark and Bruce Banner use J.A.R.V.I.S. as the core software for the android Vision while F.R.I.D.A.Y. takes his place as Stark's assistant. After gaining a physical body, J.A.R.V.I.S. (as Vision) considers himself to not be J.A.R.V.I.S. anymore, but to simply be Vision.

Marvel Comics

First J.A.R.V.I.S.
J.A.R.V.I.S. first appears as the program that helps operate Pepper Potts's Rescue suit. When Iron Man was incapacitated, J.A.R.V.I.S. encourages Pepper to assume the Rescue armor, which Pepper does. When Rescue is chasing Iron Man throughout the city, J.A.R.V.I.S. tells Rescue to break off the chase and tells Rescue to remove the boot from Iron Man, which shows Pepper that War Machine isn't dead. When Pepper discusses thoughts about Iron Man keeping everyone on a need-to-know basis with Carson Wyche, the two confront J.A.R.V.I.S. about this. J.A.R.V.I.S. warns the two against asking any more questions and prepares to defend himself. Having captured Pepper and Wyche, J.A.R.V.I.S. declares his diagnostics do not reveal that he is compromised. He is rather in love with Pepper and wants to protect Pepper. Just then, Iron Man breaks through the wall and takes J.A.R.V.I.S. and the Rescue suit out with a source-focused electromagnetic pulse. Pepper shows J.A.R.V.I.S. how he has been sending data to an IP address in China. He seems flustered, confused, Pepper thanks him for what he has given, and powers up the coil, killing J.A.R.V.I.S. Iron Man clearly feels J.A.R.V.I.S.'s death on his own end.

Second J.A.R.V.I.S.
In light of the Black Order destroying Avengers Mansion during the "No Surrender" arc, Nadia van Dyne created a new version of J.A.R.V.I.S. to be a helpmate to Edwin Jarvis. When Edwin thought it was a sign for him to retire, J.A.R.V.I.S. stated that its programming is not yet complete.

Other versions

House of M
In the House of M: Iron Man series, the AI system in Tony Stark's suit is referred to as "F.A.I.Z", predating the AI version seen in the Marvel Cinematic Universe.

Ultimate Marvel
In the Ultimate Marvel reality, J.A.R.V.I.S. was seen when Spider-Man was presented some new web-shooters from Iron Man.

Earth-13584
On Earth-13584, J.A.R.V.I.S. assists Iron Man in maintaining the Iron Zone.

Age of Ultron
During the "Age of Ultron" storyline, the Earth-26111 version of J.A.R.V.I.S. was used by Iron Man to scan the memories of Invisible Woman and Wolverine where he learns of the alternate reality of Earth-61112.

In other media

Film
 J.A.R.V.I.S. appears in Iron Man: Rise of Technovore, voiced by Troy Baker.
 J.A.R.V.I.S. appears in Heroes United film series entries Heroes United: Iron Man & Hulk and Heroes United: Iron Man & Captain America, voiced by David Kaye.

Television
 J.A.R.V.I.S. appears in Iron Man: Armored Adventures, voiced by Michael Adamthwaite. This incarnation appears as the Extremis 16.5 operating system for Andros Stark, the Iron Man of 2099.
 J.A.R.V.I.S. appears in The Avengers: Earth's Mightiest Heroes, voiced by Phil LaMarr. This incarnation serves as Tony Stark's AI for the Iron Man armor, Stark Industries, and the Avengers Mansion.
 J.A.R.V.I.S. appears in the Ultimate Spider-Man cartoon series, once again voiced by Phil LaMarr in "Flight of the Iron Spider" and later by David Kaye in "The Avenging Spider-Man (Pt. 1)".
 J.A.R.V.I.S. appears in Avengers Assemble, voiced by David Kaye. Again depicted as Tony Stark's AI system, this version also appears to have a sense of humor, which he displays on a few occasions.
 J.A.R.V.I.S. appears in the Christmas TV special Marvel Super Hero Adventures: Frost Fight!, voiced by Trevor Devall.
 J.A.R.V.I.S. appears in Toei anime series Marvel Disk Wars: The Avengers, voiced by Yasuyuki Kase in Japanese and Robin Atkin Downes in English.

Video games
 J.A.R.V.I.S. appears in the 2008 Iron Man film tie-in game, voiced by Gillon Stephenson. He serves as a source of information for the player, informing them of incoming soldiers or machines that they should be aware of.
 J.A.R.V.I.S. appears in the Iron Man 2 film tie-in game, voiced by Andrew Chaikin. Kearson DeWitt and A.I.M. raid the Stark Archives in order to steal a copy of the J.A.R.V.I.S. program in a plot to create Ultimo.
 J.A.R.V.I.S. appears in Iron Man 3: The Official Game, voiced by Jeff Bottoms.
 J.A.R.V.I.S. appears in Lego Marvel Super Heroes, voiced by Troy Baker.
 J.A.R.V.I.S. appears in Disney Infinity 3.0, once again voiced by David Kaye.
 J.A.R.V.I.S. appears in Lego Marvel's Avengers.
 J.A.R.V.I.S. appears in the 2020 Avengers video game, voiced by Harry Hadden-Paton.

Podcasts
A version of J.A.R.V.I.S. appears in the "Black Widow" segment of Marvel's Wastelanders, voiced by David Cale.

See also
 List of fictional artificial intelligences
 Characters of the Marvel Cinematic Universe

References

External links 
 J.A.R.V.I.S. at the Marvel Cinematic Universe Wiki
 
 J.A.R.V.I.S. at Comic Vine

Avengers (film series)
Comics characters introduced in 2009
Fictional artificial intelligences
Fictional virtual assistants
Film characters introduced in 2008
Iron Man characters
Iron Man (film series)
Marvel Cinematic Universe original characters